Liam Burke (born 2 September 1972) is an Irish former hurler who played as a forward and midfield for the Galway senior team.

An All-Ireland-winning captain in the under-21 grade, Burke made his first appearance for the senior team during the 1991-92 National League and became a regular member of the team over much of the next decade. During that time he won one National Hurling League winners' medal.

At club level Burke played with the Kilconieron club.

References

1972 births
Living people
Kilconieron hurlers
Galway inter-county hurlers
Connacht inter-provincial hurlers